Ulemosaurus is an extinct genus of dinocephalian therapsids that lived 265 to 260 million years ago, at Isheevo in Russian Tatarstan. It was a tapinocephalid, a group of bulky herbivores which flourished in the Middle Permian. Ulemosaurus and other tapinocephalians disappeared at the end of the Middle Permian.

Description

Only several partial skeletons and skulls have been found. This thickening is possibly related to head-butting behavior, as some researchers suggest. The species is considered a herbivore, but because the mandible is heavily constructed some palaeontologists consider it a carnivore, with the species being able to use muscle power to cut prey up with its incisors.

Classification
Ulemosaurus is a large Moschops-like form from Russia; it is probably similar enough to be included as a separate species of Moschops. Despite its advanced characteristics, it lived slightly before the Karoo forms, showing that the Moschopines, and indeed the Tapinocephalidae in general, had already attained their acme by early Capitanian time.

See also
 List of therapsids

References

Further reading
 
Riabinin, A. N., 1938. Vertebrate fauna from the Upper Permian deposits of the Sviaga basin: 1. A new Dinocephalian, Ulemosaurus sviagensi n. gen. n. sp: Ezheg. Muz. Akad. F. N. Chernysheva, v. 1, p. 4–40.

External links
Taxonomy
Dinocephalians
Therapsida: Tapinocephalia: Tapinocephalidae
Dinosulemosaurus
Tapinocephalidae

Tapinocephalians
Prehistoric therapsid genera
Guadalupian synapsids
Extinct animals of Russia
Fossil taxa described in 1938
Capitanian genus first appearances
Capitanian genus extinctions

it:Ulemosaurus